Ban Ko may refer to several places in Thailand:

Ban Ko, Bang Sai, Phra Nakhon Si Ayutthaya Province
Ban Ko, Mueang Nakhon Ratchasima
Ban Ko, Mueang Samut Sakhon
Ban Ko, Mueang Uttaradit
Ban Ko, Phrom Khiri, Nakhon Si Thammarat Province
Ban Ko, Phra Nakhon Si Ayutthaya District

See also 
 List of tambon in Thailand – B